Santo António (Portuguese for "Saint Anthony") is a parish in the district of Ponta Delgada in the Azores. The population in 2011 was 1,829, in an area of 11.75 km². It is located in the northwestern part of the island of São Miguel.

References

Parishes of Ponta Delgada